The HERC JOV-3 was a two-seat tandem helicopter originally designed by Drago Jovanovich at the Helicopter Engineering Research Corporation (HERC). The helicopter first flew in 1948.

When McCulloch Aircraft Corporation purchased HERC they improved the design for prospective military use and it became the McCulloch MC-4.

References

External links
  "Cutting 'Copter Costs" , March 1948, Popular Science

Tandem rotor helicopters
1940s United States helicopters
Single-engined piston helicopters
Aircraft first flown in 1948